In enzymology, a sinapoylglucose---malate O-sinapoyltransferase is an enzyme that catalyzes the chemical reaction

1-O-sinapoyl-beta-D-glucose + (S)-malate  D-glucose + sinapoyl-(S)-malate

Thus, the two substrates of this enzyme are 1-O-sinapoyl-beta-D-glucose and (S)-malate, whereas its two products are D-glucose and sinapoyl-(S)-malate.

This enzyme belongs to the family of transferases, specifically those acyltransferases transferring groups other than aminoacyl groups.  The systematic name of this enzyme class is 1-O-sinapoyl-beta-D-glucose:(S)-malate O-sinapoyltransferase. Other names in common use include 1-sinapoylglucose-L-malate sinapoyltransferase, and sinapoylglucose:malate sinapoyltransferase.  This enzyme participates in phenylpropanoid biosynthesis.

References 

 

EC 2.3.1
Enzymes of unknown structure
Hydroxycinnamic acids metabolism